Iridium is a chemical element with symbol Ir and atomic number 77.

Iridium may also refer to:

 Iridium satellite constellation, a satellite group providing voice and data coverage
 Iridium Communications, the company that operates the satellite constellation
 Iridium Jazz Club, in New York City
 Iridium High, a fictional high school in the television series Every Witch Way
 Iridium, a mineable resource and quality indicator from Stardew Valley

See also

 Isotopes of iridium
 Iridium-192, an isotope
 Iridium flare, a notable source of satellite glint
 Iridium anomaly, an unusual abundance of the element in a layer of rock strata
 Iris (disambiguation)